Harry Saltzman: Showman is a promotional featurette about producer Harry Saltzman, containing interviews with surviving film professionals of the first 10 James Bond production crews as well as with Saltzman's family. Produced by MGM, it is included on DVD releases of that company's From Russia with Love.

References

External links

2000 films
American documentary films
Documentary films about film directors and producers
James Bond
2000s English-language films
2000s American films